Peace Park is a park located in the University District of Seattle, Washington, at the corner of N.E. 40th Street and 9th Avenue N.E., at the northern end of the University Bridge. Its construction was conceived and led by Floyd Schmoe, winner of the 1988 Hiroshima Peace Prize, and dedicated on August 6, 1990. 45 years after the atomic bombing of Hiroshima, it is home to a full-size bronze statue of Sadako Sasaki sculpted by Daryl Smith. 

Schoolchildren and other community members from around the city of Seattle frequently drape strings of peace cranes on the statue apparently following the Japanese custom of the 'Thousand Origami Cranes'.

Historical Significance 

Peace parks, which are also known as Transboundary Conservation Areas (TCA),  are generally areas that are designated to celebrate and honor peace movements and efforts. They can be found in many parts of the world and often share similar objectives, and are also established for a number of reasons.  

Seattle's own Peace Park which is located near the University Bridge was once an area with little relevance. It was once an unused area that was regularly crowded with land fill.  With the support of the community, and Floyd Schmoe, volunteers were able to establish the park to what it is now.

The efforts to fill the space under the statue with peace cranes come from Sadako's own attempt to fold 1000 cranes. Although she died after making 644 cranes, her story inspired those around her to continue the work she began.  The origami crane which is translated to orizuru in Japanese, carries a major cultural significance. It is believed that making 1000 cranes fulfills a person's goals and dreams, and was later deemed a peace effort in honor of Sadako.

Important Figures 
The establishment of Seattle's Peace Park can be credited to the work and efforts of Floyd Schmoe, who turned his vision for the park into reality in 1990. Located in the park is a bronze statue of Sadako Sasaki, who plays an important role in the significance of the park and the history behind it.

Park founder Floyd Schmoe 

In his earlier years, Schmoe was known as a Quaker peace activist who dedicated his life towards helping others. Schmoe was a student at the University of Washington (UW) and began his studies earning a Forestry degree. He also dedicated a significant amount of time towards helping his community, and fellow UW students. In particular, he helped many Japanese Americans who were forcibly incarcerated during World War II.  He developed the American Friends Service Committee (AFSC) which was dedicated to assisting Japanese American students who were impacted by Executive Order 9066. Throughout his life he continued with his personal mission to help others and worked towards clearing out what once was a vacant lot near the University of Washington. Over the years, and with the help of the community, this led to the development of what is now known as Peace Park. 

His accomplishments in the communities he served earned him Japan's highest civilian honor. Floyd died in 2001 at the age of 105.

Statue of Sadako Sasaki 

Sadako Sasaki and her family resided in Hiroshima, Japan when the B-29 bombs, from the United States, were dropped over the city. At the young age of two, her family managed to evade the fires from the bombing and attempted to recreate the life they once had. Her family, among others, faced many challenges following the bombings, including financial struggles and sickness.  At the age of 12, it was discovered that Sadako was suffering from Leukemia, which were likely a result of the debris left behind from the B-29 bombings. Despite her illness, Sadako was a happy child and it was easily seen by those who surrounded her. During her hospitalization, she began making origami cranes and set a goal to make at least 1000. This later galvanized her peers and family to follow in her footsteps by honoring her love for origami cranes, life, and a better world. 

Seattle's Peace Park is not the only location honoring Sadako: a statue of Sadako also resides at the Hiroshima Peace Memorial Park.

Present Appearance and Characteristics 
There are sparse paper cranes laid out in front of Sadako's statue, which is placed at the center of bushes and branches. In the surrounding area, the pathways around the park separates pedestrians from busy University District streets. Along the park, there is a memorial bench. The information board gives context to the Parks purpose and for visitors. The parks daily hours are also listed for visiters to view.

Vandalism and upgrades 
In late 2003, the statue was vandalized leaving damage to the ankle and a cut off right arm of the statue.  After the statue was vandalized in December 2003, a number of people, including Sadako's family, requested the statue be relocated to the more heavily trafficked Green Lake Park.  Ultimately the Seattle Parks Department decided the statue should remain in the Peace Park, and upon restoration was returned there in mid-January 2005. The statue was later restored after the community donated towards its repair and held a celebration continuing to honor Sadako's legacy.

In 2008, Peace Park was renovated by Seattle Parks and Recreation. This included new additions such as sidewalks, stairs, and pathways that connected other public parks and trails, such as the Cheshiahud Lake Union Loop. 

The statue was vandalized again in September 2012 but has been repaired.

References

External links
Seattle Peace Park, information from the City of Seattle's government site.
Sadako statue on Daryl Smith's website portfolio.
 News account of 2012 vandalism.

Parks in Seattle
University District, Seattle
Peace parks